Megabus may refer to:
Megabus (Europe), a low-cost coach service with services in Europe owned by ComfortDelGro.
Megabus (North America), a low-cost bus service in the United States and Canada owned by Variant Equity Advisors.
Megabús, a bus rapid transit system in Pereira, Colombia.